Sanderlei Claro Parrela (born October 7, 1974 in Santos) is a former Brazilian sprinter.

Career
With a personal best of 44.29 seconds he is the South American record holder at 400 metres. He won a silver medal in this event at the 1999 World Championships. He finished fourth in the 400 metres race at the 2000 Sydney Olympics.

Parrela brought his career to a close at the 2009 Troféu Brasil Caixa de Atletismo in Rio de Janeiro. Finishing eighth in the 400 m with a season's best of 47.69, he ended a track career which had seen him break the South American record six times.

Achievements

Further achievements
(400 metres unless noted)

2005 South American Championships - silver medal
2001 South American Championships - gold medal
2000 Ibero-American Championships - gold medal
2000 Olympic Games - fourth place
1999 Pan American Games - silver medal (4x400 metres relay)
1999 World Championships - silver medal
1997 South American Championships - gold medal (4x400 metres relay)
1997 South American Championships - gold medal
1996 Ibero-American Championships - gold medal
1995 South American Championships - gold medal (4x400 metres relay)
1995 South American Championships - gold medal

References

External links

Sports reference biography

1974 births
Living people
Sportspeople from Santos, São Paulo
Brazilian male sprinters
Athletes (track and field) at the 1996 Summer Olympics
Athletes (track and field) at the 2000 Summer Olympics
Olympic athletes of Brazil
World Athletics Championships medalists
Athletes (track and field) at the 1999 Pan American Games
Pan American Games medalists in athletics (track and field)
Pan American Games silver medalists for Brazil
Medalists at the 1999 Pan American Games
20th-century Brazilian people
21st-century Brazilian people